Limatula aupouria is a species of bivalve mollusc in the family Limidae, the file shells or file clams.

References
 SealifeBase
 Powell A. W. B., New Zealand Mollusca, William Collins Publishers Ltd, Auckland, New Zealand 1979 

Limidae
Bivalves of New Zealand
Molluscs described in 1937